The 2019 Triple J Hottest 100 was announced on 25 January 2020. It is the 27th countdown of the most popular songs of the year, as chosen by listeners of Australian radio station Triple J. A record-breaking number of votes (3.21 million) were cast by listeners choosing their top ten songs of 2019. This was the first Hottest 100 countdown to reach 3 million votes.

American singer-songwriter Billie Eilish was voted into first place with her single "Bad Guy". In doing so, she became the first female solo artist, and the youngest act (at 18 years old) to top a Hottest 100. Eilish also achieved the second most entries in the countdown, at five, second only to Wolfmother who had 6 in 2005. Australian artists G Flip and Lime Cordiale achieved four entires each.

A number of Hottest 100 records were also broken. Denzel Curry's cover of "Bulls on Parade" became the highest ranking Like a Version in any Hottest 100. Slipknot's single "Unsainted" broke the record for the longest absence between countdowns, having last appeared 19 years prior with "Wait and Bleed" in the 2000 countdown.

Background
Triple J's Hottest 100 allows members of the public to vote online for their top ten songs of the year, which are then used to calculate the year's 100 most popular songs. Any song initially released between 1 December 2018 and 30 November 2019 will be eligible for 2019's Hottest 100.

Voting opened on 16 December 2019. Many artists and presenters made their votes public—out of 23 Triple J presenters, the artists they voted for most often were Julia Jacklin, Sampa the Great, and Thelma Plum.

Projections
Prior to the countdown, three favourites had emerged by a significant margin. Bookmaker Beteasy and social media analysis project 100 Warm Tunas placed "Dance Monkey" by Australian musician Tones and I, "Bad Guy" by American singer-songwriter Billie Eilish, and American rapper Denzel Curry's cover of "Bulls on Parade" for Like a Version as the three songs most likely to take out first place.

Full list

Countries represented
 Australia – 65
 United States – 27
 United Kingdom – 10
 New Zealand – 4
 Italy – 2
 Canada – 1
 Germany – 1
 Zambia – 1

Artists with multiple entries

Five entries
 Billie Eilish (1, 16, 35, 67, 91)

Four entries
 G Flip (6, 58, 66, 77)
 Lime Cordiale (7, 13, 17, 32)

Three entries
 Flume (2, 30, 81)
 Tones and I (4, 15, 26)
 Denzel Curry (twice solo and once with Glass Animals) (5, 34, 45)
 Thelma Plum (9, 65, 78)
 Tame Impala (18, 43, 52)
 Benee (19, 25, 51)
 Ruel (22, 38, 49)

Two entries
 Mallrat (once solo and once with Basenji) (3, 59)
 Illy (once solo and once with Hilltop Hoods) (10, 68)
 Post Malone (11, 93)
 Ocean Alley (24, 54)
 Meduza (29, 88)
 Goodboys (once with Meduza and once as a co-lead artist) (29, 88)
 Skegss (31, 90)
 Halsey (40, 63)
 Baker Boy (44, 98)
 Dean Lewis (46, 79)
 Holy Holy (50, 61)

Notes
 Billie Eilish became the first artist to land more than four tracks in a countdown since Violent Soho in the 2016 countdown. With "Bad Guy" voted in at #1, she also became the first solo female artist ever to top a Hottest 100.
 With his cover of "Bulls on Parade" at #5, Denzel Curry became the artist with the highest ranking Like a Version to enter a Hottest 100, narrowly overtaking DMA's' #6-placed Like a Version in 2016. This is also tied as the highest ranking cover overall in Hottest 100 history. It joins Spiderbait's cover of "Black Betty" and Boy & Bear's cover of "Fall At Your Feet", which each ranked at #5 in 2004 and 2010, respectively.
 With "Better in Blak" at #9, Thelma Plum became the highest ranking Indigenous Australian artist in Hottest 100 history, overtaking A.B. Original's 16th-placed "January 26" from 2016.
 With "Exit Sign", Hilltop Hoods marked their 21st entry in an annual Hottest 100, placing them only one song behind the all-time record of 22 entries shared by Powderfinger and Foo Fighters.
 With "Unsainted", Slipknot broke the record for the longest absence between countdowns, having last appeared 19 years prior with "Wait and Bleed" in the 2000 countdown. Previously, Paul Kelly held the record with an absence between 2000 and 2016.
The countdown featured 13 songs in a row by Australian artists, between positions 84 and 72, beating the record of nine consecutive Australian artists set in 2016.
With "Rushing Back", Flume became the second artist to achieve both the #1 and #2 spots in separate countdowns, after Kendrick Lamar achieved this in 2017.
Skeggs' cover of "Here Comes Your Man" marked the first time a Pixies song has ever featured in an annual Hottest 100. The band's songs have only ever previously featured in all-time lists in 1990, 1991 and 2009.

Top 10 Albums of 2019
The annual Triple J album poll was held across November and December and was announced on 15 December.

References

2019